Operation Eichmann is a 1961 American crime film directed by R. G. Springsteen, with Werner Klemperer in the title role. It is a highly fictionalized account of the life of the war criminal Adolf Eichmann, from his career as a member of the SS and an architect of the Holocaust to his kidnap in Argentina by the Mossad.

Plot 
After orchestrating the "Final Solution to the Jewish problem", when Germany is defeated at the end of WWII, Adolph Eichman utilizes underground networks and escapes to South America. Dissatisfied with his treatment, he attempts to assert his former authority over the organization. Realizing his delusional and dangerous demeanor, he is rebuffed and betrayed, and allowed to be captured by Mossad.

Cast
 Werner Klemperer as Lieutenant Colonel Adolf Eichmann
 Ruta Lee as Anna Kemp, Eichmann's Domestic Partner
 Donald Buka as David, Fictional Israeli Mossad Agent and Holocaust Survivor
 John Banner as Colonel Rudolf Höss, Auschwitz Camp Commander
 Hanna Hertelendy as Tessa, Höss's Wife
 Barbara Turner as Sara, David's Wife and Fellow Holocaust survivor
 Steve Gravers as Jacob, David's Brother-In-Law
 Jimmy Baird as Young David (1941-1945)
 Debbie Cannon as Young Sara (1941-1945)
 Jackie Russo as Young Jacob (1941-1945)
 Oscar Beregi, Jr. as Kuwaiti Police Commissioner
 Luis Van Rooten as SS Police General Heinrich Himmler

Production
Filming started 12 January 1961.

References

External links
 

1961 films
American war films
Films set in the 1940s
Films set in 1960
Allied Artists films
Films directed by R. G. Springsteen
Cultural depictions of Adolf Eichmann
Cultural depictions of Heinrich Himmler
1960s English-language films
1960s American films